Beebe is an unincorporated community in Athens County, in the U.S. state of Ohio.

History
A post office called Beebe was established in 1875, and remained in operation until 1931. Beebe was the name of a local family in Rome Township.

References

Unincorporated communities in Athens County, Ohio
1875 establishments in Ohio
Populated places established in 1875
Unincorporated communities in Ohio